The Dryomyzidae are a small family of flies ranging from 4–18 mm long, with prominent bristles, and yellow to brown or rust-yellow coloring. The wings are very large. The subcosta is complete and well separated from vein 1. Larvae feed on decaying organic matter - carrion, dung, and fungi.
The prelambrum protrudes from the oral cavity. Vibrissae are absent and the postvertical bristles are divergent.

The roughly 22 species are placed in 6 genera (with two additional genera known only as fossils). Dryomyzid flies are found principally in the Holarctic, though some are found in the Southern Hemisphere. Very little is known of the habits of the adults or immatures, but adults are found in moist, shady habits among low-growing vegetation.

Classification
Subfamily: Dryomyzinae Schiner, 1862 
Genus: Dryomyza Fallén, 1820 
D. amblia Kurahashi, 1981 
D. anilis Fallén, 1820 
D. badia Kurahashi, 1981 
D. caucasica Ozerov, 1987 
D. ecalcarata Kurahashi, 1981 
D. formosa (Wiedemann, 1830) 
D. pakistana Kurahashi, 1989 
†D. pelidua Statz, 1940 
D. puellaris Steyskal, 1957 
†D. shanwangensis Zhang, 1989 
D. simplex Loew, 1862 
D. takae Azuma, 2001 
Genus: Dryope Robineau-Desvoidy, 1830 
D. decrepita (Zetterstedt, 1838) 
D. flaveola (Fabricius, 1794) 
D. melanderi (Steyskal, 1957) 
Genus: Oedoparena Curran, 1934 
O. glauca (Coquillett, 1900) 
O. minor Suwa, 1981
O. nigrifrons Mathis and Steyskal, 1980
Genus: †Palaeotimia Meunier, 1908 
†P. ihoesti Meunier, 1908 
Genus: Paradryomyza Ozerov, 1987 
P. orientalis Ozerov & Sueyoshi, 2002 
P. setosa (Bigot, 1886) 
P. spinigera Ozerov, 1987 
P. steyskali Ozerov & Sueyoshi, 2002 
Genus: †Prodryomyza Hennig, 1965 
†P. electrica Hennig, 1965 
Genus: Pseudoneuroctena Ozerov, 1987 
P. senilis (Zetterstedt, 1846) 
Genus: Steyskalomyza Kurahashi, 1982 
S. hasegawai Kurahashi, 1982 
Nomina dubia
D. dubia Macquart, 1844 
D. maculipes Walker, 1861

Fossil record
Only four fossil species in three genera (all from the Tertiary) are known.

References

External links

 Family Dryomyzidae at EOL
 Image Gallery from Diptera.info

Distribution/species lists
 West Palaearctic
Nearctic
 Japan

Identification
 Steyskal GC (1957) A revision of the family Dryomyzidae (Diptera,. Acalyptratae). Pap. Mich. Acad. Sci. 42:55–68. World revision. Species keys.
 Czerny, L. (1930), Dryomyzidae und Neottiophilidae. 38b. In: Lindner, E. (Ed.). Die Fliegen der Paläarktischen Region 5(1): 1–18. Keys to Palaearctic species (in German).

 
Brachycera families